Ian McMillan may refer to:

Ian MacMillan (author) (died 2008), Hawaiian scholar and novelist
Ian McMillan (curler) (born 1991), Canadian curler
Ian McMillan (footballer) (born 1931), Scottish footballer
Ian McMillan (poet) (born 1956), English poet, journalist, playwright, and broadcaster
Iain Macmillan (1938–2006), Scottish photographer